Stormy Hearts is a 2017 musical movie written by Brenda Ogbuka and Chijioke Ononiwu. It was produced by Judith Audu and directed by Tope Alake under the collaboration studio of Judith Audu's Productions and Iroko TV.    The movie stars Christiana Martin, Theresa Edem-Isemin, Eddie Watson, Kenneth Okolie, Fred Amata, Etinosa Idemudia, Kelechi Udegbe, Greg Ojefua, Rotimi Salami, Stan Nze, and others.

Synopsis 
The story revolves around a music producer whom his student and girlfriend left him for a bigger musician in town. He met a repentant prostitute and they started a new life.

Award and nominations 
The movie was nominated in the category of the Movie with the Best Soundtrack and movie with the  Best use of Nigerian Food at the 2017 Best of Nollywood Awards.

Cast 

 Tokunbo Uba Ahmed, 
 Fred Amata, 
 Theresa Edem,
 Etinosa Idemudia, 
 Tomiwa Kukoyi, 
 Christiana Martin, 
 Ogee Nelson, 
 Stan Nze, 
 Gregory Ojefua,
 Kenneth Okolie, 
 Debbie Ohiri Oletubo,
 Rotimi Salami, 
 Kelechi Udegbe, 
 Omoye Uzamere and

References 

2017 films
Nigerian musical films